Keila-Joa is a small borough in Lääne-Harju Parish, Harju County, northern Estonia. It has a population of 373 (as of 1 January 2019). The Estonian name Keila-Joa literally means "Keila Falls", named after the river, distinguishing it from the town of Keila.

The borough is home to the third most powerful waterfall in Estonia, Keila Waterfall. In Keila-Joa there is also a small hydroelectric power plant with a capacity of 365 kW.

Keila-Joa Manor
There has been a manor house on the site of Keila-Joa manor since the 17th century. The present manor house was built in 1831–1833 and designed by St. Petersburg architect Andrei Stackenschneider. The manor represents one of the earliest examples of neo-Gothic architecture in Estonia. It was built for the family of count Alexander von Benckendorff (whose graves can be found in the park adjacent to the manor) and the building saw many prominent guests during the Imperial years, among others the Russian royal family, famous soprano Henriette Sontag and composer Alexei Lvov.

From 1927 to 1940 it was used by the Estonian Ministry of Foreign Affairs. During the Soviet occupation it was used by the Red Army.

See also
Keila Waterfall
Keila River

References

External links
Keila-Joa at Estonian Manors Portal
Keila-Joa.info virtual tour

Boroughs and small boroughs in Estonia
Manor houses in Estonia
Kreis Harrien